Victor "Pengal" Hassan, is a former Israeli footballer who played in Maccabi Netanya in the 1960s.

He is of a Tunisian-Jewish descent.

Honours
Second Division
1963–64

References

Living people
Israeli Jews
Israeli footballers
Maccabi Netanya F.C. players
Israeli people of Tunisian-Jewish descent
Year of birth missing (living people)
Association footballers not categorized by position